The 1933 Howard Bulldogs football team represented Howard College as a member of the Dixie Conference and the Southern Intercollegiate Athletic Association (SIAA) in the 1933 college football season. Led by fifth-year head coach Eddie McLane, the team comped an overall record of 7–1–2 and won the Dixie Conference title with a mark of 4–0–1.

Schedule

References

Howard
Howard
Samford Bulldogs football seasons
Howard Bulldogs football